Manasse is a surname. Notable people with the surname include:

 Jon Manasse (born 1965), American clarinetist
 Joseph S. Manasse (1831–1897), Prussian American merchant
 Maegan Manasse (born 1995), American tennis player
 Nabot Manasse (died 1958), Namibian Lutheran priest
 Paul Manasse (1866–1927), German physician